Exponát roku 1827 (English: Exhibit of the Year 1827) is a 2008 Czech action modern silent film.

Story 
A Czech tourist takes a photo at a Ukrainian train station and accidentally captures two mafia members passing a mysterious briefcase, unintentionally triggering an avalanche of events

Cast 
David Wagner
Michaela Kosiecová
Peter Lištván
Lubomír Hykl
David Ninger
Lenka Šlachtová
Matyáš Čuřík
Pavel Kučera
Stanislav Konečný
Marek Sokola
Markéta Maradová
Zdeněk Pavelka

Directed by: Miroslav Gavelčík
Executive producer: Kamil Panský
Director of Photography: Miroslav Gavelčík
Edited by and Effects: Petr Kameník 
Special Effects, Supervisor: Ondřej Klofáč

External links 
Czechoslovak Film Database

2008 films
Silent films in color
Czech silent films
Czech action films
2000s Czech films